"Best Friend's Brother" is a song recorded by American singer-songwriter Victoria Justice, billed as Cast of Victorious featuring Victoria Justice. It was produced by Kool Kojak, who also co-wrote the song with Savan Kotecha and Victoria Justice, for Victorious: Music from the Hit TV Show (2011), the soundtrack to the Nickelodeon television series, Victorious. It was released as the album's third single on May 20, 2011 through Columbia Records in association with Nickelodeon. Musically, the song runs through an electropop oriented dance beat with teen pop lyrics, and the lyrics speak of a girl's crush on her best friend's brother.

The song was met with generally positive reviews from critics, with the majority of them praising its message and aggressive sound. "Best Friend's Brother" charted on the Billboard Hot 100 at number eighty six, remaining as the third highest peaking song from the soundtrack. The accompanying music video portrays Justice dreaming of attracting her best friend's brother while her best friend remains oblivious to the attraction.

Background
"Best Friend's Brother" is the third single released from the soundtrack Victorious: Music from the Hit TV Show (2011), for the television series of the same name on Nickelodeon. It was first heard on the series's second season episode, "Prom Wrecker", which premiered on May 21, 2011 in North America, a day after the single's release. At the Avalon Theater concert night (where she also performed the song), Justice stated that the song was one of her favorites. The song was performed by Justice with backup vocals from Ariana Grande and additional instruments by Leon Thomas III in the episode. The scene where the song was performed features Justice, Grande and Thomas performing at the prom. While on the stage at the end of the episode, rain starts pouring down on them and they continue performing.

The song was written by Allan Grigg, Savan Kotecha, and Victoria Justice. Grigg also produced the track along with providing all the instruments and programming for it. The mixing for the song was provided by Greg Wells took place at Rocket Carousel in Los Angeles, California with the engineering provided by Mighty Mike Garity at Westlake Studios and Mound Studios, both of which are also in Los Angeles.

Composition
"Best Friend's Brother" is an electropop song that contains influences of teen pop and dance-pop. The song runs through a dance-oriented beat and features a rougher sound than the previous single, "Beggin' on Your Knees". The theme of this song is center around exploring emotions and managing friendships. The lyrics are about a girl who has a crush on her best friend's older brother, and even though the girl wants to pursue a relationship with him, she doesn't want to jeopardize her friendship with her best friend. While being interviewed by Neha Gandhi for Seventeen, Justice discussed the background story for the song: 
When I was around 14 years old, in 8th grade, I had this crush on my best friend’s brother. He was two years older than me. It was one of those things where I would go over her house and we would all play Halo 2 together and go swimming in the pool and stuff. I think we both had little crushes on each other, but it never went anywhere. If it had, it would have been really weird. I wouldn’t have been willing to risk my friendship for dating her brother. Friendship is always more important.

Critical reception
Jessica Dawson of Commonsensemedia, the website that rates music for parents approval for children's listening, rated the song three out of five stars, praising its positive message, stating "Although she has a crush on her BF's brother, she doesn't act on it, for the sake of her friend. It's harmless flirting." Idolator praised the song, stating "Victoria might be perplexed about the awkward sitch with her bestie, but we're banging our heads to this fist-pumping tune. It's a little rougher and tougher than Victoria's last jam, 'Beggin' on Your Knees'. In fact, it reminds us of something Pink might record if she was a lovelorn teen."

Chart performance
"Best Friend's Brother" debuted at number 93 on the Billboard Hot 100 on the June 18, 2011 chart. The next week it climbed to number 86.

Music video
The music video for the song was released on May 28, 2011 and shows the story of a girl who is passionate about her best friend's brother, and who dreams of having a chance to be alone with him. As the song describes him, the boy is six-foot and three inches tall, and is the drummer of a punk rock band. He is muscular, tan skinned, raven haired, and wears black leather vests over white t shirts. In the first part of the video, we see Victoria and her best friend apparently studying in her friend's bedroom. Victoria leaves to fetch a glass of water in the kitchen, passing her best friend's brother, played by actor/model Daniel Romer who is sitting in the living room. Once in the kitchen, she begins to "daydream" and imagines herself sliding into the living room with her socks on the hardwood floor. Victoria is now wearing an oversized oxford shirt and hot pants in an homage to the Tom Cruise film Risky Business as she swings her hair, dances, and sings to the enthusiastic boy. In the second sequence we see Victoria parked outside of the house, text messaging her friend to tell her she has arrived. She then catches a glimpse of the boy's bandmates leaving his garage. The next moment, she has another dream in which she sings on top of the car on the street and he plays drums. The climax of the video takes place in a pizzeria, where Victoria dances to the chorus of the song, when her crush walks up to her and holds her hands, confessing his feelings for her.

Performances
Justice, alongside her co-stars, Ariana Grande and Leon Thomas III, performed the song on a Victorious episode, "Prom Wrecker". She also performed the song at the Avalon concert night.

Credits and personnel
Credits are taken from Victorious liner notes.
Victoria Justice – vocals, songwriting
Ariana Grande - backup vocals
Leon Thomas III - backup vocals, guitar
Allan Grigg – songwriting, production, programming, instrumentation
Savan Kotecha – songwriting
Greg Wells – mixing
Mighty Mike Garity – engineer

Charts

Weekly charts

Year-end charts

References

2011 songs
2011 singles
Columbia Records singles
Song recordings produced by Kool Kojak
Songs from television series
Songs written by Kool Kojak
Songs written by Savan Kotecha
Songs written by Victoria Justice
Victoria Justice songs
Victorious